The Komet was an American automobile manufactured in 1911 in Elkhart, Indiana.

History 
The Sterling-Hudson Whip Company formed the Elkhart Motor Car Company in 1909. The automobiles were called Sterling except for 1911 when Komet was added. The Sterling and Komet automobiles were 4 cylinder 30/40hp cars on a 115" to 125" wheelbase. Prices ranged from $1,500 to $2,500.

862 automobiles were built by Sterling-Hudson until Elkhart Motor Car Company was sold in 1911.

References

Defunct motor vehicle manufacturers of the United States
Companies based in Elkhart County, Indiana

Brass Era vehicles
1910s cars
Cars introduced in 1911